Spring Songs is an EP by American rock band Title Fight, released on November 12, 2013 through Revelation Records. The EP's second track "Be A Toy" was premièred on August 12 through SPIN magazine, with a music video following on November 20, directed by Susy Cereijo.

Track listing
All songs written by Title Fight

Personnel 
Jamie Rhoden - guitar, vocals
Ned Russin - bass, vocals
Shane Moran - guitar
Ben Russin - drums

References

2013 EPs
Revelation Records EPs
Title Fight albums
Albums produced by Will Yip